Taylor Curran is the name of:

Taylor Curran (field hockey), Canadian field hockey player
Taylor Curran (footballer), English footballer